The Symphony No. 3 by Walter Piston was composed in 1946–47.

History
The Koussevitzky Music Foundation commissioned the Third Symphony and Piston began work on it in 1946, completing the score at Woodstock, Vermont, in the summer of 1947. It was premiered on January 9, 1948, by the Boston Symphony Orchestra conducted by Serge Koussevitzky, and the composer dedicated the score to the memory of the conductor's wife, Natalie Koussevitzky. Piston was awarded the 1947 Pulitzer Prize in Music Composition for the Third Symphony.

Analysis
The work, like the later Fourth and Sixth Symphonies is in four movements:

Andantino
Allegro
Adagio
Allegro

The symphony lasts about 35 minutes.

The symphony opens with a slow movement, involving three main themes. This is followed by a scherzo with trio and a slow variation movement. The finale is interpreted by one writer as a celebration of the end of the Second World War.

References

Sources

External links
 
 , Harvard Radcliffe Orchestra conducted by James Yannatos (1995)

Symphony No. 3
1947 compositions
Pulitzer Prize for Music-winning works
Music with dedications